

S 

 
 
 
 
 
 
 13260 Sabadell
 1115 Sabauda
 
 
 
 665 Sabine
 
 
 
 
 
 
 
 
 
 
 
 
 
 
 
 
 
 
 
 
 
 
 
 
 
 
 1626 Sadeya
 
 
 
 
 
 
 6250 Saekohayashi
 
 
 
 1364 Safara
 
 
 
 
 1163 Saga
 
 
 2709 Sagan
 
 
 
 
 
 
 
 4606 Saheki
 
 
 
 
 
 
 
 
 1533 Saimaa
 
 
 2578 Saint-Exupéry
 
 
 
 
 
 
 
 
 
 
 
 
 
 
 
 
 
 
 
 
 
 
 
 
 
 
 1979 Sakharov
 
 
 
 
 
 
 
 1166 Sakuntala
 
 
 
 
 120347 Salacia
 
 
 
 
 
 
 
 
 
 
 
 
 
 
 
 
 562 Salome
 1436 Salonta
 
 
 
 
 
 
 
 
 
 
 1083 Salvia
 
 
 
 
 
 
 
 
 
 
 
 
 
 
 
 
 
 
 
 
 
 
 
 
 
 
 
 
 
 
 
 
 
 2091 Sampo
 
 
 
 
 
 
 
 
 
 
 
 
 
 
 
 3043 San Diego
 6216 San Jose
 
 
 
 
 
 
 
 
 
 
 
 9963 Sandage
 
 
 
 
 
 1760 Sandra
 
 
 
 
 1711 Sandrine
 
 
 
 
 
 
 
 
 
 
 
 
 
 
 
 
 
 
 
 
 
 
 
 
 
 
 
 
 
 
 
 
 
 
 
 
 
 
 
 
 
 
 
 7794 Sanvito
 
 
 
 
 
 
 275 Sapientia
 80 Sappho
 
 
 
 533 Sara
 
 
 
 
 
 
 
 
 
 
 
 
 
 
 
 
 
 
 
 
 
 
 
 
 
 
 
 
 
 
 
 
 
 
 
 
 
 
 
 
 
 
 
 
 
 
 
 1012 Sarema
 
 
 
 796 Sarita
 
 
 
 
 10258 Sárneczky
 
 
 
 
 2223 Sarpedon
 
 
 
 
 
 
 
 
 
 
 
 461 Saskia
 
 
 
 
 
 
 
 
 
 
 
 
 
 
 
 
 
 
 
 
 
 
 
 
 
 
 
 
 
 
 
 
 
 7336 Saunders
 
 
 
 
 
 
 
 
 
 
 
 
 
 
 
 
 
 
 
 1494 Savo
 1525 Savonlinna
 
 
 
 
 
 
 
 
 
 
 
 
 
 
 
 
 
 
 
 
 
 
 
 460 Scania
 
 
 
 
 
 
 3333 Schaber
 
 
 
 
 
 
 
 
 1542 Schalén
 
 6376 Schamp
 
 
 
 
 
 
 
 
 643 Scheherezade
 
 
 596 Scheila
 
 
 
 
 
 
 
 
 
 
 
 
 
 
 
 
 
 
 
 1255 Schilowa
 2308 Schilt
 
 
 
 
 
 
 
 
 
 
 
 
 
 
 
 
 
 
 
 
 
 922 Schlutia
 
 
 
 
 
 1743 Schmidt
 
 
 
 
 
 
 
 
 
 
 
 
 
 
 2959 Scholl
 
 
 
 
 
 
 
 
 1235 Schorria
 
 
 
 
 
 
 
 
 
 
 1911 Schubart
 
 
 2384 Schulhof
 
 
 
 
 4003 Schumann
 
 
 
 2429 Schürer
 
 
 
 13006 Schwaar
 
 
 
 
 
 
 
 
 837 Schwarzschilda
 
 989 Schwassmannia
 
 
 
 
 
 
 
 
 
 
 
 
 
 
 3350 Scobee
 
 
 
 
 
 876 Scott
 
 
 
 
 
 
 
 
 
 
 
 
 
 
 
 
 
 
 
 
 
 
 
 
 
 
 
 155 Scylla
 1306 Scythia
 
 
 
 
 
 
 13070 Seanconnery
 
 
 
 
 
 
 
 
 
 
 
 
 
 
 
 
 
 
 
 
 
 
 
 
 
 90377 Sedna
 
 
 
 
 
 
 892 Seeligeria
 
 
 
 
 
 
 
 
 
 
 3822 Segovia
 
 
 
 
 
 
 
 
 
 
 
 4607 Seilandfarm
 
 
 
 1521 Seinäjoki
 
 
 
 
 
 
 
 
 
 
 
 
 
 
 5381 Sekhmet
 
 
 5357 Sekiguchi
 
 
 
 
 
 
 
 580 Selene
 3288 Seleucus
 
 500 Selinur
 
 
 
 
 
 
 
 
 
 86 Semele
 
 
 
 
 
 584 Semiramis
 
 
 
 
 1014 Semphyra
 
 
 
 3133 Sendai
 
 
 2608 Seneca
 
 
 
 
 
 
 
 
 
 550 Senta
 
 
 
 
 
 
 483 Seppina
 
 1103 Sequoia
 
 838 Seraphina
 
 
 
 
 
 
 
 
 
 
 
 
 
 
 
 
 
 
 
 9968 Serpe
 
 
 
 2691 Sersic
 
 
 
 
 
 
 
 
 
 
 
 
 
 
 
 
 
 
 
 
 
 7846 Setvák
 
 2121 Sevastopol
 
 
 1737 Severny
 
 
 
 
 
 
 
 
 
 
 
 
 
 
 
 
 
 
 
 
 
 
 
 
 1648 Shajna
 2985 Shakespeare
 
 
 
 
 
 
 
 
 
 
 
 
 
 
 1994 Shane
 
 
 2197 Shanghai
 
 
 
 
 
 
 
 
 
 
 
 
 1881 Shao
 
 1123 Shapleya
 1902 Shaposhnikov
 
 
 
 
 
 
 
 
 
 
 
 
 
 5426 Sharp
 
 
 
 
 
 
 
 
 
 
 
 
 
 
 
 
 
 
 
 
 
 
 1196 Sheba
 
 
 
 
 
 
 
 
 
 
 
 
 
 
 
 
 
 
 
 
 
 
 
 
 
 
 
 
 
 2036 Sheragul
 
 
 
 
 
 
 
 
 
 
 
 
 
 
 
 
 
 
 
 
 
 
 
 
 
 
 
 
 
 
 
 
 
 
 
 
 
 
 
 
 
 
 
 
 
 
 
 
 
 
 
 
 
 
 
 
 
 
 
 
 
 
 
 
 
 
 
 
 
 
 
 
 
 
 
 
 
 
 
 
 
 
 
 
 
 
 
 
 
 
 
 
 
 
 5692 Shirao
 
 
 
 
 
 
 
 
 
 
 
 
 
 
 
 
 
 
 
 
 
 
 
 
 4364 Shkodrov
 
 
 
 
 
 2074 Shoemaker
 
 
 
 
 
 8306 Shoko
 
 
 
 
 
 
 
 
 
 
 
 
 
 
 
 
 
 
 
 
 
 
 
 
 
 
 
 
 
 
 
 
 
 
 
 
 
 
 
 
 
 16525 Shumarinaiko
 
 
 
 1977 Shura
 
 
 
 
 
 
 
 
 
 
 
 
 1405 Sibelius
 1094 Siberia
 168 Sibylla
 
 
 
 
 1258 Sicilia
 
 7866 Sicoli
 
 
 
 
 
 
 
 579 Sidonia
 
 
 
 1632 Sieböhme
 
 
 
 386 Siegena
 
 
 
 
 
 
 
 
 
 
 
 
 
 
 552 Sigelinde
 
 
 
 
 
 459 Signe
 
 
 1493 Sigrid
 
 502 Sigune
 11066 Sigurd
 
 
 3201 Sijthoff
 
 
 
 
 79360 Sila-Nunam
 
 
 
 257 Silesia
 
 
 1446 Sillanpää
 
 
 
 
 
 
 
 
 
 
 
 
 
 
 
 
 
 
 
 748 Simeïsa
 
 
 
 
 
 
 
 1033 Simona
 
 
 
 
 
 
 
 
 
 
 
 1675 Simonida
 
 
 
 
 
 
 
 
 
 
 
 
 
 
 
 
 
 
 
 
 
 
 
 
 
 
 3391 Sinon
 
 
 
 
 
 
 
 
 
 
 
 
 
 
 1009 Sirene
 332 Siri
 
 
 
 116 Sirona
 
 
 823 Sisigambis
 
 
 
 1866 Sisyphus
 244 Sita
 
 
 
 
 
 
 1170 Siva
 
 
 140 Siwa
 
 
 
 
 
 
 
 
 
 
 
 
 
 
 2554 Skiff
 
 
 
 
 
 
 
 
 
 
 
 
 
 
 1130 Skuld
 
 
 1854 Skvortsov
 
 
 
 
 
 
 
 
 
 
 
 
 
 
 
 
 
 
 
 
 1766 Slipher
 
 
 
 
 
 
 1807 Slovakia
 
 
 
 
 
 7545 Smaklösa
 
 
 2047 Smetana
 
 
 
 
 
 
 
 
 
 
 
 
 1731 Smuts
 
 
 
 
 
 1262 Sniadeckia
 
 
 
 
 
 
 
 
 
 
 3708 Socus
 
 
 
 
 
 1393 Sofala
 
 
 
 
 
 
 
 
 
 
 
 
 
 
 
 
 
 
 
 8991 Solidarity
 
 
 
 
 
 
 
 
 
 
 
 
 
 
 
 
 
 
 
 2815 Soma
 1430 Somalia
 
 
 
 
 5771 Somerville
 
 
 
 
 
 
 
 
 
 
 
 
 
 
 
 1293 Sonja
 
 1039 Sonneberga
 
 
 
 
 
 
 
 2433 Sootiyo
 251 Sophia
 
 
 
 
 
 134 Sophrosyne
 
 
 
 
 
 
 731 Sorga
 
 
 6882 Sormano
 
 
 
 
 
 
 
 
 
 
 
 
 
 
 
 
 
 2228 Soyuz-Apollo
 
 
 
 2975 Spahr
 
 
 
 
 
 
 
 
 
 
 
 
 
 
 
 
 
 
 
 
 
 
 
 
 896 Sphinx
 2065 Spicer
 
 
 
 
 
 
 
 
 1091 Spiraea
 1330 Spiridonia
 37452 Spirit
 
 
 
 
 
 
 
 
 4789 Sprattia
 5380 Sprigg
 
 
 
 
 
 
 1564 Srbija
 
 
 
 
 
 
 
 
 
 
 
 
 
 
 
 
 
 
 
 
 
 
 
 
 
 
 
 
 
 
 
 
 
 
 
 
 
 
 
 
 
 
 
 
 
 
 
 
 
 
 
 4150 Starr
 
 
 
 
 
 
 831 Stateira
 
 
 
 
 
 
 
 1147 Stavropolis
 
 2035 Stearns
 
 
 
 
 4713 Steel
 
 
 
 
 
 
 
 
 
 
 
 
 
 
 
 
 
 
 
 
 
 707 Steina
 
 
 
 
 
 
 
 
 
 1681 Steinmetz
 2867 Šteins
 
 
 
 
 
 
 
 
 
 
 
 
 
 
 
 
 
 
 
 
 
 
 
 2146 Stentor
 
 
 
 
 
 
 220 Stephania
 
 
 
 
 
 
 
 
 
 8373 Stephengould
 
 
 
 
 
 
 
 
 
 
 
 
 
 
 
 
 566 Stereoskopia
 
 
 995 Sternberga
 
 
 
 
 
 
 
 
 
 
 
 
 
 
 
 
 
 
 
 
 
 
 
 
 
 
 
 
 
 
 
 
 
 
 
 
 
 
 
 
 
 
 
 
 
 
 
 
 
 
 
 3794 Sthenelos
 
 
 
 
 
 
 
 
 
 
 
 
 
 
 1847 Stobbe
 
 
 
 
 
 
 
 
 
 
 
 
 
 
 
 
 
 
 
 
 
 
 
 
 
 
 
 
 
 
 
 
 
 
 1019 Strackea
 
 
 
 
 
 
 
 
 
 
 
 
 
 
 
 
 
 
 
 
 
 
 
 
 
 
 
 
 
 
 
 1628 Strobel
 
 
 
 
 1422 Strömgrenia
 
 
 
 
 
 1124 Stroobantia
 
 
 
 
 
 3054 Strugatskia
 768 Struveana
 
 
 
 
 
 
 
 
 
 
 
 
 
 
 
 
 
 
 
 
 
 964 Subamara
 
 
 1692 Subbotina
 
 
 
 
 
 
 
 
 
 4176 Sudek
 
 
 
 
 
 
 
 
 12002 Suess
 
 417 Suevia
 
 
 
 
 
 
 
 
 
 
 
 
 
 
 
 
 
 
 
 752 Sulamitis
 563 Suleika
 
 
 
 
 
 
 
 
 
 
 
 
 
 
 
 
 
 
 1928 Summa
 11885 Summanus
 
 
 
 
 
 
 
 
 
 
 
 
 1424 Sundmania
 
 
 
 
 
 
 
 
 
 
 
 
 
 
 
 
 
 
 
 1656 Suomi
 
 
 
 
 
 
 
 
 
 4383 Suruga
 
 
 
 
 
 
 
 
 
 
 542 Susanna
 
 
 
 
 
 
 
 
 
 
 
 
 
 
 933 Susi
 
 
 
 1844 Susilva
 
 
 
 
 
 
 
 
 
 
 6726 Suthers
 
 
 
 
 1927 Suvanto
 
 
 
 
 
 
 
 
 
 
 
 
 
 
 
 
 
 
 
 
 
 
 
 
 
 
 329 Svea
 
 
 
 
 
 
 
 4118 Sveta
 
 
 
 
 
 
 
 
 
 
 
 
 
 
 
 
 
 
 4082 Swann
 
 
 
 992 Swasey
 
 
 
 
 
 
 
 
 882 Swetlana
 
 
 
 
 1637 Swings
 
 
 
 1714 Sy
 
 
 
 
 
 
 
 519 Sylvania
 
 
 87 Sylvia
 
 
 
 
 
 
 1104 Syringa
 3360 Syrinx
 4647 Syuji

See also 
 List of minor planet discoverers
 List of observatory codes

References 
 

Lists of minor planets by name